The Wigan by-election of 23 September 1999 was held after the death of the incumbent Labour MP, Roger Stott.

The by-election was contested by nine candidates in total, with Labour selecting Neil Turner, who had been a local councillor for 27 years, to defend the seat. Meanwhile, the Conservatives chose Tom Peet, who was an active Trade Unionist and had worked at a nearby coal mine.

The result was a hold for the Labour Party, with Turner gaining 59.6% of the vote, in spite of a 5% swing to the Conservative Party.

Result of the by-election

Result of the previous general election

References

By-elections to the Parliament of the United Kingdom in Greater Manchester constituencies
Elections in the Metropolitan Borough of Wigan
1999 elections in the United Kingdom
1999 in England
1990s in Greater Manchester
September 1999 events in the United Kingdom